The Pauwasi River is a river in Western New Guinea.

See also
List of rivers of Western New Guinea
Pauwasi languages
East Pauwasi languages
West Pauwasi languages
South Pauwasi languages

References

Rivers of Papua (province)